The 2010 East Carolina Pirates football team represented East Carolina University in the 2010 NCAA Division I FBS football season. The Pirates played their home games in Dowdy–Ficklen Stadium and were led by head coach Ruffin McNeill, a former Pirate football player and former Texas Tech defensive coordinator. He was in his first year as head coach. They were members of Conference USA After winning consecutive C-USA championships, the Pirates finished the season 6–7, 5–3 in C-USA and were invited to the Military Bowl where they were defeated by Maryland 20–51.

Before the season

Recruiting

Purple/Gold Spring Game
The annual Purple/Gold Spring Game was held in the spring during the PirateFest and Pigskin Pigout weekend activities on April 17 in downtown Greenville, NC. Due to the stadium expansion in the East endzone, the format of the game was changed to a modified half-field scrimmage, with both teams taking turns on offense and defense.

Schedule

Coaching staff

Depth chart

Game summaries

Tulsa

The Pirates defeated the Golden Hurricane 51-49 on a hail mary pass from Quarterback Dominique Davis to freshman receiver Justin Jones as time expired. East Carolina began the season 1-0 overall and in conference as Tulsa fell to 0-1. The two teams are now tied in the all-time series, 5-5.

Memphis

Virginia Tech

North Carolina

Southern Miss

NC State

Marshall

UCF

Navy

UAB

Rice

SMU

Postseason

NFL Draft Picks
 Dwayne Harris - Round 6: 11th (176th Overall) - Dallas Cowboys

Awards
 Conference USA Most Valuable Player: Dwayne Harris, Sr. WR
 Conference USA Newcomer-of-the-Year: Dominique Davis, Jr. QB
 Rivals.com Conference USA Most Valuable Player: - Dominique Davis, Jr. QB
 Rivals.com Conference USA Offensive Most Valuable Player: - Dominique Davis, Jr. QB

Honors

Weekly Honors
 Sept. 6 Conference USA Offensive Player-of-the-Week: Dominique Davis, Jr. QB
 Oct. 18 Conference USA Offensive Player-of-the-Week: Dominique Davis, Jr. QB

Teams
 Rivals.com First Team All-Conference USA
 Dominique Davis, Jr. QB
 Dwayne Harris, Sr. WR
 Rivals.com Second Team All-Conference USA
 Lance Lewis, Jr. WR
 Willie Smith, Sr. OL
 Emanuel Davis, Jr. DB
 Michael Barbour, Jr. K

References

East Carolina
East Carolina Pirates football seasons
East Carolina Pirates football